Cândido Cá e Sá (born 7 November 1992) is a Portuguese professional basketball player for Sporting CP.

He played in the United States between 2014 and 2016 for San Jac Ravens and between 2016 and 2018 for Rutgers Scarlet Knights. Went back to Portugal to play for the basketball section of Sporting CP.

References

1992 births
Living people
Centers (basketball)
Portuguese expatriate basketball people in the United States
Portuguese men's basketball players
Rutgers Scarlet Knights men's basketball players
S.L. Benfica basketball players
Sporting CP basketball players
Sportspeople from Lisbon